Xanthopsoroma is a genus of lichenized fungi in the family Pannariaceae. It contains 2 known species.

Xanthopsoroma was described as a new genus in 2010 when it was separated from the closely related genus Psoroma. Characteristics of Xanthopsoroma species include the production of usnic acid and a series of distinct triterpenes as well as showing morphological differences from the related Psoroma and Psorophorus.

Species
 Xanthopsoroma contextum  (Stirt.) Elvebakk & S.G.Hong
 Xanthopsoroma soccatum  (R.Br. ex Cromb.) Elvebakk

References

Lichen genera
Peltigerales
Taxa named by André Michaux
Peltigerales genera